Sartwell is an American surname. Notable people with the surname include:

Crispin Sartwell (born 1958), American philosopher, self-professed anarchist and journalist
Philip Sartwell (1908–1999), American epidemiologist and professor
Henry Parker Sartwell (1792–1867), American botanist